Pirvezg (also Romanized as Pīrvezg) is a village in Dasht-e Rum Rural District, in the Central District of Boyer-Ahmad County, Kohgiluyeh and Boyer-Ahmad Province, Iran. At the 2006 census, its population was 111, in 27 families.

References 

Populated places in Boyer-Ahmad County